Sponastrime dysplasia is a rare condition characterised by facial and skeletal abnormalities.

Signs and symptoms

The main features of this condition are evident in skeleton and face.

Facial features:
 Macrocephaly
 Frontal bossing
 Midface hypoplasia
 Depressed nasal root
 Small upturned nose
 Prognathism

Skeletal features:
 Shortened limbs (more pronounced in lower limbs)
 Short stature
 Progressive coxa vara

On X ray:
 Abnormal vertebral bodies (particularly in the lumbar region)
 Avascular necrosis of the capital femoral epiphyses
 Striated metaphyses
 Generalized mild osteoporosis
 Delayed ossification of the carpal bones

Other associated conditions:

These are variably present
 Cataracts
 Hypogammaglobulinemia
 Intellectual disability
 Short dental roots
 Subglottic stenosis
 Tracheobronchomalacia

Genetics

This condition has been associated with mutations in the Tonsoku-like, DNA repair protein (TONSL) gene. This gene is located on the long arm of chromosome 8 (8q24.3). This gene is also known as NFKBIL2.

Pathopysiology

This is not understood. It appears that the TONSL gene product is involved in genome repair.

Diagnosis

This can be suspected when the usual facial and skeletal features are present. It is confirmed by sequencing the TONSL gene.

Differential diagnosis

Short limbed dwarfism syndrome in association with immunodeficiency.

Treatment

There is no specific treatment for this condition. Management is supportive.

Epidemiology

This condition is considered to be rare with less than 100 cases reported in the literature.

History

This condition was first described in 1983.

References

Genetic diseases and disorders
Rare syndromes
Autosomal recessive disorders